Megan McDowell is an American literary translator. She principally translates Spanish-language works into English. Originally from Kentucky, she studied English at DePaul University in Chicago. Upon graduation, she worked at the Dalkey Archive Press. She then moved to Chile, moving back to the US after three years to study translation at the UT Dallas. Her first work of translation was Alejandro Zambra's The Private Lives of Trees. Since then, she has collaborated with Zambra on several more books.

Among other books she has translated are: 
 Fever Dream by Samanta Schweblin
 Things We Lost in the Fire by Mariana Enriquez
 The Dangers of Smoking in Bed by Mariana Enriquez
 Ways of Going Home by Alejandro Zambra
 Multiple Choice by Alejandro Zambra
 Mouthful of Birds by Samanta Schweblin
Little Eyes by Samanta Schweblin
 My Documents by Alejandro Zambra
 Seeing Red by Lina Meruane
Nervous System by Lina Meruane
 Humiliation by Paulina Flores
The Crossed-Out Notebook by Nico Giacobone
My Favorite Girlfriend was a French Bulldog by Legna Rodriguez
Yesterday by Juan Emar
 Camanchaca by Diego Zúñiga
 Under This Terrible Sun by Carlos Busqued
 Not to Read by Alejandro Zambra
 Dead Stars by Álvaro Bisama
 Colonel Lágrimas by Carlos Fonseca Suarez
Natural History by Carlos Fonseca Suarez
 Older Brother by Daniel Mella
 Divorce Is in the Air by Gonzalo Torné
 La Vida Doble by Arturo Fontaine
 Fantasia by Alejandro Zambra
 Loving Pablo, Hating Escobar by Virginia Vallejo
 Son of Black Thursday by Alejandro Jodorowsky

McDowell lives and works in Santiago de Chile.

Recognition 
 Winner of the 2022 National Book Award for Translated Literature for Seven Empty Houses by Samanta Schweblin
 Shortlisted for the 2021 Kirkus Prize for The Dangers of Smoking in Bed by Mariana Enriquez
Shortlisted for the 2021 Man Booker International Prize for The Dangers of Smoking in Bed by Mariana Enriquez 
2020 Literature Award from the American Academy of Arts and Letters
Longlisted for the 2020 Man Booker International Prize for Little Eyes by Samanta Schweblin
Longlisted for the 2019 Man Booker International Prize for Mouthful of Birds by Samanta Schweblin
 Winner of the 2018 Premio Valle-Inclan for Seeing Red by Lina Meruane
Shortlisted for the 2017 Man Booker International Prize for Fever Dream by Samanta Schweblin

References

Year of birth missing (living people)
Living people
21st-century American translators
Spanish–English translators
DePaul University alumni
University of Texas at Dallas alumni
American expatriates in Chile